Yasen Borisov (born 2 June 1962) is a Bulgarian badminton player. He competed in two events at the 1992 Summer Olympics.

References

External links
 

1962 births
Living people
Bulgarian male badminton players
Olympic badminton players of Bulgaria
Badminton players at the 1992 Summer Olympics
Place of birth missing (living people)